Reiverlöwen Oberhausen was an ice hockey team in Oberhausen, Germany. They played in the Deutsche Eishockey Liga from 1997 to 2002.

The club was founded in 1997, and folded in 2007.

Achievements
Regionalliga champion: 2004

Season-by-season record

References

Ice hockey teams in Germany
Ice hockey clubs established in 1997
Sports clubs disestablished in 2007
Oberhausen
1997 establishments in Germany
2007 disestablishments in Germany